Lake Ōmāpere is the largest lake in the Northland Region of New Zealand. It is located to the North of Kaikohe.

The lake sits within the Kaikohe-Bay of Islands volcanic field. The lake was formed when an ancient lava flow blocked a valley, forming the northern shoreline.  It is five kilometres in length and covers 12.3 km², however it is only 2.6 metres deep (and as low as 1.5 m during summer). The lake has few inflow streams, mostly in the southern part of the lake. The Utakura River (south-western margin) is the main outflow which goes to the Hokianga Harbour. The lake catchment is predominantly pasture, with a few areas of native scrub and mature bush.

Culture and history 
Lake Ōmāpere is of great cultural and environmental value to Māori tangata whenua. 

In May 1845 the Battle of Puketutu, an engagement of the Flagstaff War, occurred at the pā of Hone Heke at Puketutu, on the shores of Lake Ōmāpere.

The lake level was lowered between 1903 and 1929, but by 1947 silting had restored much of its level.

Water quality and ecology 
The water quality in the lake is generally poor and the lake is prone to blooms of toxic algae. The lake is monitored by Northland Regional Council, and the environmental information can be viewed on the LAWA website.

The Lake Ōmāpere Restoration and Management Project aims to develop and implement a voluntary lake management strategy that will work towards improving the health of the lake and help assist the Lake Omapere Trustees in their role as kaitiaki.

References

External links
Restoring the Mauri of Lake Omapere - video clip at NZ On Screen
Lake Omapere Te Puna Mātauranga o Aotearoa | National Library of New Zealand

Far North District
Lakes of the Northland Region
Lava dammed lakes
Kaikohe